If the coal seam reaches a fault, the seam may be significantly displaced, depending on the type of fault and its offset. Machinery trying to mine the coal may not be able to reach the displaced seam, if the displacement is too large. Coal mines use a combination of boreholes and high-resolution seismic reflection data to identify the larger faults and avoid the most faulted areas at the mine planning stage.

Water table

If the water table is too high, the mine will flood with water. While mining, water needs to be constantly pumped out and this is expensive.

Washout

If a distributary or river changes course and cuts into the swamp material that will form coal, the coal seam is not fully formed and there may be a problem with mining it.

Thickness of seams

If the seams are too thin it may be uneconomic to mine the coal. The cost of production could exceed the selling price.

Splitting of seams

If the seam splits, due to a delta collapsing, sand and silt sediments pile up on top until that area is covered. This may make all or part of the coal seam uneconomic to mine as it is too thin.

References 

Coal mining